The Pseudanabaenaceae are a family of cyanobacteria.

Genera
As accepted by WoRMS;

 Arthronema Komárek & Lukavský 1988
 Halomicronema 
 Spirocoleus 

 Subfamily Heteroleibleinioideae
 Persinema 

 Subfamily Pseudanabaenoideae
 Calenema 
 Heteroleibleinia 
 Jaaginema Anagnostidis & Komárek 1988
 Limnothrix Meffert 1988
 Plectolyngbya 
 Prochlorothrix Burger-Wiersma et al. 1989
 Pseudanabaena Lauterborn 1915
 Romeria 
 Sokolovia 
 Tapinothrix 

 Subfamily Spirulinoideae
 Toxifilum 

 Chamaenema  (uncertain > nomen dubium)

References

Synechococcales
Cyanobacteria families